Paul Krasny (August 8, 1935 – November 12, 2001) was an American film and television director.

Beginning his career in 1964, he amassed many credits in television. Some of his television credits include Hawaii Five-O, Mission: Impossible, Mannix, CHiPs, Quincy, M.E., Hart to Hart, Dallas, V, Simon & Simon, Crazy Like a Fox, Miami Vice, MacGyver and Moonlighting.

Filmography
D.A.: Conspiracy to Kill (1971)
Adventures of Nick Carter (1972)
The Letters (1973)
Christina (1974)
Big Rose: Double Trouble (1974)
Mobile Medics (1976)
Joe Panther (1976)
The Islander (1978)
When Hell Was in Session (1979)
Fugitive Family (1980)
Alcatraz: The Whole Shocking Story (1980)
Terror Among Us (1981)
Fly Away Home (1981)
Catalina C-Lab (1982)
Time Bomb (1984)
Still Crazy Like a Fox (1987)
Kojak: Ariana (1989)
Kojak: Flowers for Matty (1990)
Back to Hannibal: The Return of Tom Sawyer and Huckleberry Finn (1990)
Tagteam (1991)
Drug Wars: The Cocaine Cartel (1992)
Two Fathers: Justice for the Innocent (1994)
Search and Rescue (1994)

References

External links

1935 births
2001 deaths
American film directors
American television directors
Artists from Cleveland
Film directors from Ohio